Xiangyun may refer to:

Xiangyun (Auspicious clouds), traditional Chinese stylised cloud decorative patterns
Xiangyun County, Dali Prefecture, Yunnan, China
Xiangyun, Fujian, town in Nan'an, Fujian, China
Xiangyun, Henan, town in Wen County, Henan, China

People and fictional characters with the given name Xiangyun include:
Zhu Xiangyun (born 1950), Chinese table tennis player
Shi Xiangyun, character in Dream of the Red Chamber